Rhythmic gymnastics (Spanish: Gimnasia Rítmica), for the 2013 Bolivarian Games, took place from 27 November to 29 November 2013.

Medal table

Medalists

References

Events at the 2013 Bolivarian Games
Bolivarian Games,2013
Rhythmic gymnastics,Bolivarian Games
Rhythmic gymnastics,2013